Gustaaf Van Slembrouck (25 March 1902, Ostend – 7 July 1968, Ostend) was a Belgian professional cyclist from 1926 to 1934, nicknamed 'Den Staf'. He won 4 Tour de France stages, and wore the yellow jersey for 6 days in 1926. He finished in second place in the 1926 Paris–Roubaix.

Major results

1926
Tour de France:
Winner stage 3
Tour of Flanders:
2nd place
1927
Tour de France:
Winner stages 7 and 12
Tour of Flanders:
2nd place
1929
Tour de France:
Winner stage 5
1932
De Panne
Erembodegem-Terjoden

References

External links

Tour de France results

Belgian male cyclists
1902 births
1968 deaths
Belgian Tour de France stage winners
Sportspeople from Ostend
Cyclists from West Flanders